Naohiro Furuya (古谷 直広, Naohiro Furuya; born July 30, 1963 in Urawa, Saitama Prefecture) is a Japanese racing driver.

Career 
Furuya was active in automobile racing. He has competed in the Italian Formula 3 Championship, the Italian Touring Car Championship and in Formula 3 races at the Macau Grand Prix and the Monaco Grand Prix. He came second at the Japanese Formula Three Championship, after Naoki Hattori. In the following year, Furuya joined Japan's top formula and raced until 1995. From 2003 to 2010 he also took part in the Japanese Super-Endurance (Super Taikyu Series) taking 8 wins in total and 6 pole positions, with a best finish of 3rd in the championship.  He also participated in the All Japan GT Championship race until 2010.

References 

1963 births
Living people
Japanese racing drivers
People from Saitama Prefecture